Shatrunjaya or Shetrunjaya ("place of victory against inner enemies") originally Pundarikgiri), are hills located by the city of Palitana, in Bhavnagar district, Gujarat, India. These hills have similarities to other hills where Jain temples have been built in Bihar, Gwalior, Mount Abu and Girnar.

The Jain's sacred hill of Shatrunjaya have 865 temples atop itself. The hills were sanctified when Rishabha, the first tirthankara of Jainism, gave his first sermon on the top of this hill. The ancient history of the hills is also traced to Pundarika Swami, a chief Ganadhara and grandson of Rishabha, who attained Nirvana/Moksha here. His shrine located opposite to the main Adinath temple, built by Son of Rishabha, Bharata.

There are several alternate spellings, including Śatruñjaya, Satrunjaya, Shetrunja, and Shetrunjo. Shatrunjaya was also known as Pundarikgiri as Pundarik was said to have attained nirvana on this mountain. Alternate names include Siddhakshetra or Siddhanchal as many thirtankaras have received enlightenment here.

Shatrunjaya is the most sacred place for the Shwetambara Jains.

Etymology
The name for Mount 'Shatrunjaya' where it is located, means a "place of victory" or "which conquers enemies".

Geography

The Gulf of Khambhat is to the south of the Shatrunjaya Hills, Bhavnagar town is to its north, and a river flows between the two hills. Legend states that the hill is a part of the Girnar ranges. Palitana town is at the base of the foothills,  from Bhavanagar. The topography is rugged while the landscape is drought-affected.

Culture
The hills are an ancient tirtha (religious pilgrimage site). The Palitana temples, a pilgrimage complex on both hills and their saddle, are reached by climbing approximately 3750 stone steps, which are carved into the mountain. The hills are closed to pilgrims for four months during the monsoon season. The pilgrimage is known as "Shri Shantrunjay Teerth Yatra". It occurs from the Poornima day (Full Moon Day) of Kartik month according to the Jain calendar (October–November as per the Gregorian calendar). Jains assemble at the foot of the hills to undertake the yatra (religious journey).

See also
 Palitana temples
 Palitana
 Tirth Pat

References

Bibliography
 

Hills of Gujarat
Jain pilgrimage sites